Thierry Thulliez (born 4 August 1974) is a French jockey.

Major wins
France
 Critérium de Saint-Cloud - (1) - Epicuris (2014)
 Critérium International - French Fifteen (2011)
 Poule d'Essai des Poulains - Style Vendome (2013)
 Prix d'Astarté - (1) - Darjina (2007)
 Prix de Diane - (1) - Carling (1995)
 Prix du Cadran - (1) - Mille Et Mille (2015)
 Prix Jacques Le Marois - (1) - Six Perfections (2003)
 Prix Jean Prat - (1) - Stormy River (2006)
 Prix du Jockey Club - (2) - Sulamani (2002), Blue Canari (2004)
 Prix Jean-Luc Lagardère - (1) - Full Mast (2014)
 Prix Marcel Boussac - (1) - Six Perfections (2002)
 Prix de l'Opéra - (1) - Satwa Queen (2007)
 Prix Vermeille - (1) - Carling (1995)

Italy
 Premio Roma - (1) - Feuerblitz (2013)

United States
 Breeders' Cup Mile - (1) - Domedriver (2002)

References
 NTRA profile

French jockeys
1974 births
Living people